The Blue Ribbon Network is a policy element of the London Plan relating to the waterways of London, England.

Aside from the River Thames, the major components of the network are:

Grand Union Canal
Regent's Canal
River Lee Navigation
River Brent
River Roding
River Rom
River Crane
Beverley Brook
River Wandle
Ravensbourne River
Silk Stream
Pymmes Brook
Salmons Brook
Moselle Brook
Ingrebourne River
River Cray

The network also includes docks, reservoirs and lakes and covered over sections of rivers. The London Plan promotes the use of the waterways for leisure, passenger and tourist traffic, and the transport of freight and general goods. The canal part of the network makes up  of waterway. The London Waterways Commission advises the Mayor of London on the implementation of the waterways policies.

References

Rivers of London
Lee Navigation
Regent's Canal
Water in London